William L. Linegar (1871–1951) was a cooper, union leader and politician in Newfoundland. He represented St. John's West in the Newfoundland House of Assembly from 1924 to 1928.

Linegar was born in St. John's. Sometime after 1906, he became president of the Cooper's Union. He ran unsuccessfully for a seat in the Newfoundland assembly as a Workingmen's Party candidate in 1919. He was defeated in a subsequent by-election and again in 1923 before being elected in 1924 as a Liberal-Conservative. In 1928, Linegar was named to the Board of Liquor Control. He became president of the Cooper's Union again in 1938.

References 

1871 births
1951 deaths
Members of the Newfoundland and Labrador House of Assembly
Trade unionists from Newfoundland and Labrador
Dominion of Newfoundland politicians